Trifurcula chamaecytisi is a moth of the family Nepticulidae. It was described by Zdenek Laštuvka and Ales Laštuvka in 1994. It is known from Austria, the Czech Republic, Slovenia, Hungary and Russia.

The larvae feed on Chamaecytisus species, including C. austriacus.

References

Nepticulidae
Moths of Europe
Moths described in 1994